Olivier Malcor (born 28 January 1975) is a former professional tennis player from France.

Biography
Born in Falaise, Malcor was a right-handed player who turned professional in 1994. He had a career best ranking of 161 and competed in the qualifying draw of all four grand slam tournaments. His biggest title win came at the Ostend Challenger in 1999, beating Álex López Morón in the final. He qualified for the main draw of three ATP Tour tournaments, the 1999 U.S. Men's Clay Court Championships in Orlando, the San Marino Open in 2000 and the 2001 Grand Prix Hassan II in Casablanca.

Malcor is married to former WTA Tour player Sarah Pitkowski.

He has coached several top French players, including Julien Benneteau, Michael Llodra, Nicolas Mahut and Paul-Henri Mathieu.

Challenger titles

Singles: (1)

References

External links
 
 

1975 births
Living people
French male tennis players
French tennis coaches